Awang are traditional dugout canoes of the Maranao and Maguindanao people in the Philippines. They are used primarily in Lake Lanao, the Pulangi River, and the Liguasan Marsh for fishing or for transporting goods. They have long low hulls that are carved from single trunks of lauan and apitong trees. They have no outriggers but have a single sail or a paddle.

See also
 Owong
 Avang
 Buggoh
 Vinta

References 

Indigenous ships of the Philippines
Canoes